Sony Pictures Home Entertainment released all six seasons of Dawson’s Creek on DVD between 2003 and 2006. A standalone Region 1 DVD of the series finale which features an extended cut was released in 2003. The complete series was released in 2009 on DVD while Mill Creek Entertainment will release the upcoming Blu-ray version on December 6, 2022.

DVD

Note:
Seasons 2-6 contain music alterations, due to copyright issues. The theme song has also been altered starting with Season 3.

Blu-ray

Music
The theme song, "I Don't Want to Wait" was written and performed by Paula Cole. For the first season, international broadcasts used "Run Like Mad", performed by Jann Arden, but switched to Cole's song for the remainder of the run. The producers originally planned to use "Hand in My Pocket" by Alanis Morissette for the theme (it was, in fact, used in the original pilot) but she would not grant them permission and Cole's song was substituted. The show's final episode features a video montage made by Dawson which includes footage seen in the original credits sequence, and is soundtracked by "Hand in My Pocket". There were two soundtrack albums.

Because the producers failed to secure the rights when the shows were produced and did not wish to pay for them later, most of the songs that aired in the original broadcasts (and are used in the syndicated run) were replaced in the DVD edition of the show despite the show having a signature sound. Starting with season 3, "I Don't Want To Wait" (the series opening theme song) was also dropped from the DVD releases, to be replaced by Jann Arden's "Run Like Mad" (including Adam Field's piano version of Cole's song used in 5.04 "The Long Goodbye"); however, "I Don't Want To Wait" was still featured when played using non-English language, plus, none of the songs used in the finale were altered on the DVD (including "I Don't Want to Wait").

Due to these copyright issues, several scenes in episodes from the fifth and sixth seasons were altered or completely deleted. These scenes include performances from these episodes:
"Jessie's Girl" by Feel Love Fury in 5.11 and 5.17 (deleted).
"Son of a Preacher Man" by Busy Philipps in 5.11.
"I Ran (So Far Away)" by Katie Holmes in 5.17 (deleted).
"Girls Just Wanna Have Fun" by Busy Philipps in 6.05 (deleted).

References 

Dawson's Creek
Dawson's Creek